Audie Murphy (20 June 1925 – 28 May 1971) was a highly decorated American soldier and Medal of Honor recipient who turned actor. He portrayed himself in the film To Hell and Back, the account of his World War II experiences. During the 1950s and 1960s he was cast primarily in westerns. While often the hero, he proved his ability to portray a cold-blooded hired gun in No Name on the Bullet. A notable exception to the westerns was The Quiet American in which he co-starred with Michael Redgrave. Murphy made over 40 feature films and often worked with directors more than once. Jesse Hibbs who directed To Hell and Back worked with the star on six films, only half of which were westerns. When promoting his 1949 book To Hell and Back he appeared on the radio version of This Is Your Life. To promote the 1955 film of the same name, he appeared on Ed Sullivan's Toast of the Town. He was a celebrity guest on television shows such as What's My Line? and appeared in a handful of television dramas. Murphy's only television series Whispering Smith had a brief run in 1961. For his cooperation in appearing in the United States Army's Broken Bridge episode of The Big Picture television series he was awarded the Outstanding Civilian Service Medal.

Early career

Murphy became a national celebrity following his World War II military service when Life magazine proclaimed him America's "most decorated soldier" in its 16 July 1945 issue cover story. That magazine cover brought him to the attention of veteran actor James Cagney who invited him to Hollywood. When Murphy arrived in California after his military discharge, Cagney cancelled the hotel reservations he'd made for Murphy and instead took him into his own home, "I got the shock of my life. Audie was very thin. His complexion was bluish-gray." Commenting years later on his first impression, Cagney said, "[Murphy was] in such a nervous condition that I was afraid he might jump out of a window. I took him home and gave him my bed." He spent three weeks as a guest of Cagney and then returned to Texas before finally agreeing to an offer from brothers James and William Cagney of $150 a week as a contract player with their production company. The Cagneys gave Murphy personal attention on acting techniques. He also took lessons at the Actors' Lab on Sunset Boulevard. Murphy studied voice techniques, learned judo, and trained with choreographer John Boyle, Cagney's dance coach for Yankee Doodle Dandy. A 1947 disagreement with William Cagney ended his association with the brothers without having been cast in a film production.

He moved into Terry Hunt's Athletic Club and survived on his Army pension of $113 a month. In 1948 he became acquainted with writer David "Spec" McClure who got him a $500 bit part in Texas, Brooklyn & Heaven. He began dating actress Wanda Hendrix in 1946. Her agent got Murphy a bit part in the 1948 Alan Ladd film Beyond Glory directed by John Farrow. Murphy and Hendrix married in 1949 and divorced in 1951.

His 1949 film Bad Boy gave him his first leading role. Murphy became acquainted in Texas with Interstate Theatre executive James "Skipper" Cherry, who was best man at Murphy's 1951 marriage to Pamela Archer and the namesake of the couple's second son. Murphy's association with Cherry brought him to the attention of Texas independent producer Paul Short. With financing from Texas theater owners and the children's charitable organization Variety Clubs International, Short cast Murphy in Bad Boy to help promote the charity's work with troubled children. Murphy performed well in the screen test, but Steve Broidy, president of the project's production company Allied Artists did not want to cast someone in a major role with so little acting experience. Cherry, Short, and the theater owners refused to finance the film unless Murphy played the lead. The 1933 Thames Williamson novel The Woods Colt caught Murphy's attention during this period of his career. He secured the rights to the story in the 1950s, and Marion Hargrove was hired to write the script. The film was never made.

Universal Studios signed Murphy to a seven-year studio contract at $2,500 a week. His first film for them in 1950 was as Billy the Kid in The Kid from Texas. He wrapped up that year making Sierra starring his wife Wanda Hendrix, and Kansas Raiders as outlaw Jesse James. He and director Budd Boetticher become acquainted through Terry Hunt's Athletic Club where Murphy would request to be his boxing partner. Murphy appeared in the 1951 title role of Boetticher's first westernThe Cimarron Kid.

The only film Murphy made in 1952 was Duel At Silver Creek with director Don Siegel. Murphy would team with Siegel one more time in 1958 for The Gun Runners. He only worked one time with director Frederick de Cordova, who later became producer of The Tonight Show Starring Johnny Carson. Murphy and de Cordova made Column South in 1953. George Marshall directed Murphy in the 1954 Destry, based on a character created by author Max Brand. Two previous versions, one in 1932 with Tom Mix and one in 1939 with Jimmy Stewart and Marlene Dietrich, were both titled Destry Rides Again.

The only screenplay John Meredyth Lucas ever did for a Murphy film was the 1953 Tumbleweed, an adaptation of the Kenneth Perkins novel Three Were Renegades . Murphy played Jim Harvey, whose horse Tumbleweed displayed a talent for getting the hero out of any scrape. Director Nathan Juran oversaw Tumbleweed, as well as Gunsmoke and Drums Across the River.

As Murphy's film career began to progress, so did his efforts to improve his skills. He continually practiced his fast draw with a gun. When Hugh O'Brian bet $500 that he could draw a gun faster than anyone in Hollywood, Murphy raised the ante to $2500 and wanted to use live ammunition; O'Brian did not accept. He took both private and classroom acting lessons from Estelle Harman, and honed his diction by reciting dialogue from William Shakespeare and William Saroyan.

The Red Badge of Courage
Murphy was lent to MGM at a salary of $25,000 to appear in the 1951 The Red Badge of Courage directed by John Huston and adapted from the Stephen Crane novel. At the urging of Spec McClure and celebrity columnist Hedda Hopper, over the misgivings of producer Gottfried Reinhardt and studio executives Louis B. Mayer and Dore Schary, director Huston cast Murphy in the lead of The Youth (Henry Fleming in the novel). The preview screening audiences were not enthusiastic, causing Schary to re-edit Huston's work, eliminating several scenes and adding narration by James Whitmore. MGM trimmed advertising efforts on what they believed was an unprofitable film. What eventually hit the theaters was not a commercial success, and it was also not the film both Murphy and Huston believed they had made. Murphy unsuccessfully tried to buy the rights to the film in 1955 in an attempt to re-edit and re-release it. Huston tried to buy it in 1957, but was told the original negative of what he had filmed was destroyed.

To Hell and Back

Although Murphy was initially reluctant to appear as himself in To Hell and Back, the film version of his book, he eventually agreed to do so. Terry Murphy portrayed his brother Joseph Preston Murphy at age four. The film was directed by Jesse Hibbs with an on-screen introduction by General Walter Bedell Smith. Susan Kohner, daughter of Murphy's agent Paul Kohner, made her acting debut in the film. The finale shows Murphy being awarded the Medal of Honor while images of his unit's casualties pass across the screen. It became the biggest hit in the history of Universal Studios at the time.

Both Murphy and Universal gave serious considerations to a follow-up version of his post-war life. Murphy rejected the Richard J. Collins script The Way Back which created the fictional scenario that filming To Hell and Back had been so therapeutic for Murphy that it cured him of his combat fatigue. Spec McClure scripted a second unused version of The Way Back that incorporated Murphy's real-life friends into the storyline and ended with the star living happily ever after with Pamela and their two sons. A third version by an unknown writer focused on the Murphy-McClure friendship and was rejected by the threat of a lawsuit from McClure. Desi Arnaz offered to bankroll a 1965 project titled Helmets in the Dust. At Murphy's request McClure wrote a film treatment, but the project never came to fruition.

Later films
The Hibbs-Murphy team proved so successful in To Hell and Back that the two worked together on a total of five subsequent films. Hibbs directed Murphy in Ride Clear of Diablo in 1954. The partnership resulted in the commercially unsuccessful non-traditional 1956 western Walk the Proud Land. Hibbs and Murphy teamed with each other for non-westerns Joe Butterfly and World in My Corner. They worked together a final time in the 1958 western Ride a Crooked Trail. Veteran character actor Dan Duryea who portrayed villain Whitey Kincaide in Ride Clear of Diablo played a second lead in two more Murphy vehicles, Night Passage and Six Black Horses. The Story of Charles Russell with Murphy as the lead was under development at Universal but shelved after the disappointing receipts of Walk the Proud Land. Murphy, however, was enthusiastic enough about a biopic of Charles Marion Russell to give serious consideration tor his own production that would star Guy Mitchell in the lead, but the film was not made.

Murphy was hired by Joseph L. Mankiewicz to play the role of The American (Alden Pyle in the book) in the 1958 version of The Quiet American, replacing Montgomery Clift when the latter dropped out. Michael Redgrave replaced Laurence Olivier who dropped out when Clift withdrew. The cold-war drama filmed in Vietnam was a departure from the genre in which Murphy had normally been cast.

Murphy formed a partnership with Harry Joe Brown to make three films, the first of which was the 1957 The Guns of Fort Petticoat. The partnership fell into disagreement over the remaining two projects, and Brown filed suit against Murphy. Although Murphy was to co-star with Robert Mitchum in the 1957 film Night Riders, scheduling conflicts prevented him from doing so. Springing from his skin diving hobby, Murphy hired diving expert Paul Kazear to write the script Skin Diver with a Heart . Murphy reneged on the deal and the film was never made. Kazear sued Murphy in 1958.

The 1950s  ended with Murphy appearing in three westerns. He co-starred with 14-year-old Sandra Dee in the 1959 film The Wild and the Innocent. The film's cast was rounded out with Gilbert Roland, Joanne Dru and Jim Backus. Murphy's collaboration with Walter Mirisch on Cast a Long Shadow included an uncredited stint as co-producer. The film co-starred Terry Moore. His performance in No Name on the Bullet was well received. The storyline follows the cool, jaded hired gun as the townspeople are gripped with fear by his presence.

Murphy and Huston worked together one more time in the 1960 film The Unforgiven, in which Murphy took second billing as Burt Lancaster's racist kid brother who was bent on the destruction of the Kiowa.Writer Clair Huffaker wrote the screenplay for 1961's Seven Ways from Sundown and Posse from Hell. Author Bob Herzberg deemed the scripts two of the best Murphy worked with in that decade. Herbert Coleman directed Posse from Hell as well as the World War II drama Battle at Bloody Beach set in the Philippines.

Willard W. Willingham and his wife, Mary, were friends of Murphy's from his earliest days in Hollywood and who worked with him on a number of projects. Williard was a producer on Murphy's 1961 television series Whispering Smith. He additionally collaborated on Bullet for a Badman  in 1964 and Arizona Raiders in 1965. The latter was based on activities of Quantrill's Raiders and was a remake of the George Montgomery 1951 film The Texas Rangers . The film also featured Buster Crabbe. Willard was a co-writer on the screenplay for Battle at Bloody Beach. The Willinghams as a team wrote the screenplays for Gunpoint as well the script for Murphy's last starring lead in a western, 40 Guns to Apache Pass . Released through Columbia Pictures in May 1967, the story centered on Murphy's character retrieving a cache of stolen rifles sold to Apache leader Cochise.

Apache Rifles in 1964 was another formula Murphy western. He remained at Universal for a few more years, then left to work at Columbia and Allied Artists before making several films in Europe. In 1966 he made Trunk to Cairo in Israel. He felt the film was, "the worst James Bond parody I've ever seen," but was unable to get out of the commitment.

His own company FIPCO Productions produced his last film A Time for Dying . He had a cameo role as Jesse James, and his sons Terry and James were given small roles. Willard W. Willingham played Frank James. Budd Boetticher wrote the script, and agreed to the production as a return favor for an earlier time when Murphy had bailed him out of financial setbacks. The production was beset with financial problems, and the set burned twice. The movie opened in France in 1971 but was not shown in the United States until its limited release in 1982. Two other projects that Murphy and Boetticher planned to produce, A Horse for Mr Barnum and When There's Sumpthin' to Do, never came to fruition.

Murphy made more than 40 feature films in his career.

Films

Television

The only television series Murphy starred in was the 1961 Whispering Smith in which he played the title character. Based on the film of the same name, the show was about a 19th-century Denver railroad investigator. Episodes were gleaned from real-life cases of the Denver Police Department. The United States Senate Subcommittee on Juvenile Delinquency was concerned about the violent content in the show and leveled charges against the network. 26 episodes had been filmed, but not all of them aired.

The cooperation of the United States Army and the United States Defense Department was extended for Murphy's media appearances to publicize the film To Hell and Back. Among the 1955 celebrity television shows on which Murphy appeared to promote the film was Toast of the Town hosted by Ed Sullivan.

The Man, a 1960 suspense episode of Startime, was based on an original Broadway play written by Mel Dinelli. Murphy played a mentally unbalanced stranger who posed as a student and handyman and terrorized homeowner Thelma Ritter.

In 1960, he was awarded the Outstanding Civilian Service Medal for his cooperation in the production of The Big Picture television series episode Broken Bridge.

Radio

Public Service Announcements

Notes

Footnotes

Citations

References

Further reading

External links

 

History of Hollywood, Los Angeles
Male actor filmographies
Audie Murphy
1950s in American cinema
1960s in American cinema
1940s in American cinema
American filmographies